Astragalus shevockii is a rare species of milkvetch known by the common names Little Kern milkvetch and Shevock's milkvetch. It is endemic to Tulare County, California, where it grows in the High Sierra, generally on granite-based soils in Jeffrey pine forests.

Description
Astragalus shevockii is a slender perennial herb producing thin, hard, hairy stems up to 35 centimeters long. The leaves are a few centimeters in length and are made up of several widely spaced oval-shaped leaflets. The inflorescence is an open cluster of up to 13 cream-colored flowers each about a centimeter long.

The fruit is a hairy, papery legume pod 1 to 3 centimeters long.

References

External links
Jepson Manual Treatment - Astragalus shevockii
USDA Plants Profile: Astragalus shevockii

shevockii
Endemic flora of California
Flora of the Sierra Nevada (United States)
Natural history of Tulare County, California